Wilson's Diner is a historic diner at 507 Main Street (US Route 20) in Waltham, Massachusetts.

The diner was built by the Worcester Lunch Car Company as #819, and was delivered to this site by the company in March 1949.  It is a well-preserved example of the company's post-World War II craftsmanship.  The diner is ten bays wide and three deep, and sits on a brick foundation.  A kitchen wing, built of concrete blocks, connects the diner to the house at 507 Main Street.  The entrances to the diner are at either end, with original stainless steel doors bearing sunburst motifs.  Inside the diner is a full-length marble counter with center staff access, with 18 counter stools, and wooden booths lining the front wall.

The diner was listed on the National Register of Historic Places in 1999.

Gallery

See also
 National Register of Historic Places listings in Waltham, Massachusetts

References

External links

 Official website

Diners on the National Register of Historic Places
Diners in Massachusetts
Restaurants on the National Register of Historic Places in Massachusetts
Buildings and structures in Waltham, Massachusetts
Restaurants established in 1949
Commercial buildings completed in 1949
National Register of Historic Places in Waltham, Massachusetts